Matteo Ricci College (French: Collège Matteo Ricci) is a Mixed Catholic secondary school in Anderlecht, Brussels, Belgium. It opened in September 2019 and is a Jesuit college, the first Jesuit school to be opened in Belgium in the 21st century. It is located on Boulevard Poincaré, 400 metres north east of Brussels-South railway station.

History
In Brussels, the French-speaking Jesuits were already present at St Michael's College and St Jean Berchmans Church. In 2015, the Jesuits decided to build a new school in the Anderlecht municipality of the region and started the plans for its construction. There was a need for extra schools in the area, with many nearby schools being over-registered. Construction of the school was supported by "those involved in the Brussels community life, by former students of the Jesuits and by the Society of Jesus, in dialogue with the Archdiocese of Mechelen-Brussels." In November 2017, it was reported that the Maimonides Jewish Athenaeum in Anderlecht would close because of a lack of students. With the site of former athenaeum vacant, it was decided to open the new school there. In January 2019, it was reported by La Libre and RTBF that a new Jesuit college offering General Secondary Education was being built, affiliated to the General Secretariat of Catholic Education (French: Secrétariat Général de l’Enseignement Catholique) in French-speaking Belgium, and that it would open in September 2019. The first director of the school is Anne L'Olivier, who was previously director at Notre-Dame de la Sagesse School.

Facilities
The school opened with a capacity of 820 students. It has 5 buildings, including a sports hall and a performance hall. As part of teacher training and introduction classes for new students, new teachers give supervised remedial classes to new students three weeks before the start of the academic year.

See also
 Matteo Ricci
 List of Jesuit sites in Belgium

References

External links
 

Secondary schools in Brussels
Jesuit secondary schools in Belgium
2019 establishments in Belgium
Educational institutions established in 2019
Anderlecht